There are several bands which has recorded albums called Live at Hammersmith.

 Live at Hammersmith '79, Ted Nugent album
 Live at Hammersmith (Whitesnake album)
 Live at Hammersmith (Twisted Sister album)
 Live at Hammersmith (Rick Wakeman album)
 Live at Hammersmith (The Darkness album)

Similar names 

 Live at the Hammersmith Odeon (Kate Bush album)
 Live at the Odeon Hammersmith London, Billy Connolly comedy album
 No Sleep 'til Hammersmith, Motörhead's 1981 live album
 Live at the Hammersmith Odeon (Nuclear Assault album)
 Live at the Hammersmith Odeon '81, The Stranglers album
 Live at Hammersmith '84, by Jethro Tull
 Beast over Hammersmith, by Iron Maiden
 Live at Hammersmith Odeon, by Black Sabbath
 Hammersmith Odeon London '75, by Bruce Springsteen